Abdou Razack Traoré (born 28 December 1988) is an Ivorian-born Burkinabé professional footballer who plays for Chinese club Nantong Zhiyun.

Career

Rosenborg
Traoré was born in Abidjan, the Ivory Coast. He played for Raja Casablanca before he ended his contract and joined Rosenborg on a free transfer a few months later. At Rosenborg, he plays alongside his compatriot and Ivory Coast international Didier Ya Konan, who joined the club in December 2006 from homeland club ASEC Abidjan. In August 2007, it was reported by Norwegian newspapers that Traoré was beat up and robbed while being on vacation in Ivory Coast.

In the November 2007 issue of World Soccer he was featured on their list of the 50 most exciting teenagers in world football.

Violent episode
On 24 October 2008, it became known that Traoré knocked down fellow Rosenborg player Øyvind Storflor during a practice session. The following day Rosenborg announced that Traoré would be banned from playing the last two matches of the season.

Lechia Gdańsk
Traoré's contract would run out at the end of 2010 and his last year in Rosenborg was difficult with little amount of playing time. Rosenborg's Chief of Football Erik Hoftun stated "We thank Abdou for his spell at the club. Unfortunately, he didn't develop as much as we expected, but we wish him good luck in the future" after his departure from the Norwegian champions. On 20 August 2010, Traoré was sold to Polish Ekstraklasa club Lechia Gdańsk, for an undisclosed fee. On 28 August, he made his debut for Lechia in a league match against Śląsk Wrocław. On 21 September, he scored his first goal in a cup match against Górnik Zabrze. Four days later, he scored his first and second goal in a league game against Górnik Zabrze.

Gaziantepspor
On 15 January 2013, Traoré joined Turkish Süper Lig club Gaziantepspor on a free transfer.

Sivasspor
On 31 August 2019, he has signed 1+1 year contract with Sivasspor.

International career
He made his national debut for Burkina Faso against Namibia on 27 March 2011.

Personal life
The Abidjan born Traoré holds a Burkinabè passport as his parents are from Burkina Faso.

Career statistics

Club
As of 21 December 2021

International

International goals
Scores and results list Burkina Faso's  goal tally first.

Honours
Rosenborg
Tippeligaen: 2009, 2010
Superfinalen: 2010
Konyaspor
Turkish Super Cup: 2017

References

External links

1988 births
Living people
2012 Africa Cup of Nations players
2013 Africa Cup of Nations players
2015 Africa Cup of Nations players
2017 Africa Cup of Nations players
Association football midfielders
Burkina Faso international footballers
Burkinabé expatriate footballers
Burkinabé expatriate sportspeople in Norway
Burkinabé expatriate sportspeople in Turkey
Burkinabé footballers
Ekstraklasa players
Eliteserien players
Expatriate footballers in Morocco
Expatriate footballers in Norway
Expatriate footballers in Poland
Expatriate footballers in Turkey
Gaziantepspor footballers
Ivorian emigrants to Burkina Faso
Ivorian footballers
Ivorian people of Burkinabé descent
Konyaspor footballers
Lechia Gdańsk players
Citizens of Burkina Faso through descent
Raja CA players
Rosenborg BK players
Footballers from Abidjan
Sportspeople of Burkinabé descent
Süper Lig players
21st-century Burkinabé people